Tom Grindberg (born 3 November 1961) is a British comic book illustrator. His British comic book work includes 2000 A.D. Presents #16-19 and Judge Dredd #10-11 for Fleetway in 1987.

Among his earliest DC Comics work was illustrating "Privilege", a five-page story in DC New Talent Showcase #12 (December 1984), an anthology series intended to provide work for up-and-coming artists who did not have a regular assignment.  Grindberg's other DC work includes work on Action Comics, Adventures of Superman, Aquaman, Azrael, Detective Comics, Batman, Captain Atom, Firestorm the Nuclear Man, Green Lantern, Hawk and Dove, Checkmate, and Ion.

His Marvel Comics work includes Marvel Comics Presents, Silver Surfer, Daredevil, and work on several Conan the Barbarian books, including Conan, Conan Saga, Conan the Savage, and Savage Sword of Conan.

Grindberg penciled and inked the 1996 Doom comic book, and also worked on Solar for Valiant Comics in 1995 with writer Dan Jurgens.

Bibliography

DC 
Action Comics (Phantom Stranger) #613-614; (Superman) #749, 757 (1988, 1998)
Aquaman #1.000.000 (1998)
Azrael #20 (1996)
Batman #484-485 (1998–99)
Batman: Bride of The Demon, graphic novel (1990)
Batman: Catwoman Defiant, graphic novel (1992)
Captain Atom #34 (1989)
Checkmate #27-29 (1990)
Deathstroke #58 (1996)
Detective Comics Annual #4 (1991)
Elvira's House of Mystery #1, 5–6, 11 (1986–87)
Firebrand #6 (1996)
Firestorm, vol. 2, #80-85 (1988–89)
Flash & Green Lantern: The Brave and The Bold, miniseries, #4 (2000)
Green Lantern, vol. 3, #82, 87, 93; 80-Page Giant #1; Annual #4 (1997–98)
Guy Gardner: Warrior (along with Marc Campos) (1996)
Hawk and Dove #25-26 (1991)Ion #5-6 (2006)New Talent Showcase #7, 11-12, 17 (1984–85)New Titans Annual #6-7 (1990–91)Outsiders, vol. 3, #37 (2006)Secret Origins #9, 12 (1986–87)Sovereign Seven #35 (1998)Superboy Annual #4 (1997)Supergirl/Prysm: Double-Shot (1998)Superman #563, 570 (1998–99)Superman, vol. 2, #140, 147, Annual #8 (1996–99)Superman: The Man of Steel #84, 92 (1998–99)Teen Titans Annual #1 (among other artists) (2006)

 Marvel Avengers #379 (1994)Cosmic Powers #5 (1994)Daredevil #333-337 (1994–95)Justice #12-13 (1987)Marvel Comics Presents (Shang-Chi) #1-8 (1988)Marvel Holiday Special 1992–1993Marvel Team-Up, vol. 2, (Spider-Man) #5 (1998)Punisher: The Ghosts of Innocents, miniseries, #1-2 (1993)Savage Sword of Conan #149 (1988)Secret Defenders #9-14 (1993–94)Silver Sable and the Wild Pack #11-12 (1993)Silver Surfer, vol. 3, #84, 93-94, 100-102, 104-109, 111-116, Annual #7 (1993–96)Spider-Man 2099 #14, 25, Annual #1 (1993–94)Spider-Man Team-Up #2 (1996)
 Star Trek Deep Space Nine #1 (1996)Thor Annual #18 (1993)Venom: Along Came A Spider (1996)Warlock and The Infinity Watch #16-17, 19, 21, 23, 24, 26-27 (1993–94)What If? (Daredevil) #73 (1995)X-Factor Annual #2 (1987)

 Valiant Comics Solar #51-54 (1995)

 Role-playing games 
 Conan: Adventures in an Age Undreamed Of (2016, Modiphius Entertainment, inner pages illustrations by Tom Grindberg, among others)

 Other publishers Armor'' #1-4 (Continuity, 1985–88)
 Tarzan  (Edgar Rice Burroughs, Inc., 2012-current)

References

External links 
 

1961 births
Living people
American comics artists
American illustrators
American speculative fiction artists
Fantasy artists
Role-playing game artists
Science fiction artists